Brisbane tuff is a type of rock, formed as a result of a volcanic eruption. As the name suggests, it is a type of tuff found in Brisbane, Queensland, Australia. It is a form of welded ignimbrite. Brisbane tuff comes in a variety of colours: pink, green, blue (grey) and purple. The different colours are due to the extent of oxidation of iron and manganese.

It is often incorrectly described as porphyry.

History 
Brisbane tuff began to be used during the period when Captain Patrick Logan was the commandant of the Moreton Bay penal colony.

Brisbane tuff is found in various parts of Brisbane and was quarried extensively in the early history of Brisbane at the Kangaroo Point Cliffs and the (now) Windsor Town Quarry Park for use in construction of Brisbane's earliest buildings.

Geology 
Brisbane tuff was formed by the welding and compaction of volcanic ash more than 226 million years ago. It displays pyroclastic flows of rock fragments deposited as the volcanic ash was forming.

It is a form of welded ignimbrite. Brisbane tuff comes in a variety of colours: pink, green, blue (grey) and purple. The different colours are due to the extent of oxidation of iron and manganese.

Construction
Brisbane tuff has been used in the construction of the following Brisbane buildings, many of them now heritage-listed:
 Commissariat Store, William Street
 Cathedral of St Stephen, Elizabeth Street
 Old Bishopsbourne Chapel (also known as Chapel of the Holy Spirit), Milton Road
 St Martin's House, Ann Street
 St Mary's Anglican Church, Kangaroo Point
 Manor Apartment Hotel, Queen Street (former Colonial Mutual Life building) using Benedict stone
 Shell House, Ann Street

Benedict stone 

Benedict stone is a mixture of cement and crushed Brisbane tuff used on building facades as an alternative to full stone construction. It was manufactured by Benedict Stone (Qld) Pty Ltd which was established by Roman Catholic Archbishop of Brisbane, James Duhig, to manufacture the stone required for the Holy Name Cathedral, Fortitude Valley. The product was developed at the turn of the twentieth century by American manufacturer, Benedict. Duhig obtained a licence from America and opened the Benedict Stone works at Bowen Hills on 9 August 1929. In February 1930 Colonial Mutual Life (CML) advanced Duhig a  mortgage on his properties which included the stone works. A mutually-dependent relationship developed between CML, Duhig and Jack Hennessey, architect. CML used Benedict stone to build a number of their Australian offices, ensuring some of their mortgage was repaid and employed Hennessey and Concrete Constructions (Qld) Ltd, Brisbane (Duhig's architect and contractor for the Holy Name Cathedral).

Tunnelling

The extent and hardness of Brisbane tuff deposits has often been a barrier to building tunnels in Brisbane due to its 100–150 megapascal strength. However, since 2007, advances in tunnel-boring equipment with tungsten carbide cutting heads has enabled a number of major tunnels to be constructed in Brisbane, e.g. the Clem Jones Tunnel which passes through the Kangaroo Point area.

References

External links 

Volcanic rocks
Brisbane
Geology of Queensland
Volcanism of Australia